Val Keckin (born Valdemar Christian Keckin) is a former professional American football quarterback. He played with the San Diego Chargers of the American Football League during the 1962 AFL season.

References

San Diego Chargers players
American football quarterbacks
Southern Miss Golden Eagles football players
1938 births
Living people
American Football League players
Players of American football from Los Angeles